Hamid Mowlana (Hamid Molana, born in Tabriz, East Azerbaijan, Imperial State of Iran) is an Iranian-American author and academic. He is Professor Emeritus of International Relations in the School of International Services at American University in Washington, D.C. He was an advisor to the former Iranian President Mahmoud Ahmadinejad.

Education and academic career
Mowlana was Founding Director of the International Communication Program in the School of International Service at American University from 1968 to 2005. He has also served as Visiting Professor or Guest Scholar in Africa, Asia, Europe, and Latin America. He was instrumental in establishing the first degree program in international and intercultural communication studies. He obtained his B.S. in Economics in 1959 and earned his M.S. in Journalism in 1960 and his PhD in Communication and Political Science in 1963 from Northwestern University.

Mowlana has worked for UNESCO in Paris and is a former president of the International Association for Media and Communication Research (IAMCR). He wrote regularly for Kayhan daily, one of the main leading newspapers in Iran during the 1990s and 2000s. As of 2019 Mowlana's bibliography listed over 1400 printed works (books, book chapters, journal articles, book reviews, and magazine and newspaper articles).

Mowlana received a number of awards including the University Faculty Award for Outstanding Scholarship, Research and Other Professional Contributions in 1993, the International Communication Association's Award for Outstanding Research in 1977, American University's School of International Service Award for Outstanding Contribution to Academic Development in 1980 and 1988 and for Thirty Years of Distinguished Leadership and Scholarship in 1998, and the Scholar/Teacher of the Year Award in 2000. He was also the recipient of the International Studies Association's Distinguished Senior Scholar Award in International Communication at its 43rd Annual Conference held in New Orleans, Louisiana in 2002.

Mowlana was honored by the Iranian universities and academies for his life achievements and was designated nationally in Iran as an "Eternal One"—“Chehrehaye Mandegar" in 2003. On the Persian tradition honoring noted scholars he was named as an honorary advisor to the former Iranian President Mahmoud Ahmadinejad.

Honorary advisor
On August 19, 2008, the Islamic Republic News Agency, reported that President Mahmoud Ahmadinejad had appointed Mowlana as his advisor, asking Mowlana to help with the objectives of his government in "providing justice, friendship, serving the society and promotion of public life status."

Major Publications

Books
 Mowlana, H. (1985). International flow of information: A global report and analysis (Reports and Papers on Mass Communication, No. 99). Paris, France: UNESCO. 
 Mowlana, H. (1996). Global communication in transition: The end of diversity? Thousand Oaks, CA: Sage.
 Mowlana, H. (1997). Global information and world communication: New frontiers in international relations (2nd ed.). London, UK: Sage.
 Mowlana, H., & Wilson, L. J. (1988). Communication technology and development. Paris, France: UNESCO.
 Mowlana, H., & Wilson, L. J. (1990). The passing of modernity: Communication and the transformation of society. White Plains, NY: Longman.

Edited Books
 Gerbner, G., Mowlana, H., & Nordenstreng, K. (Eds.). (1993). The global media debate: Its rise, fall, and renewal. Norwood, NJ: Ablex. 
 Gerbner, G., Mowlana, H., & Schiller, H. I. (Eds.). (1996). Invisible crises: What conglomerate control of media means for America and the world. Boulder, CO: Westview Press.
 Kamalipour, Y., & Mowlana, H. (Eds.). (1994). Mass media in the Middle East: A comprehensive handbook. Westport, CT: Greenwood Press.
 Mowlana, H. (Ed.). (1989). Aspects of the mass media declaration of UNESCO (International Association for Mass Communication Research, Occasional Papers, No. 9). Budapest, Hungary: Hungarian Institute for Public Opinion Research.
 Mowlana, H., Gerbner, G., & Schiller, H. I. (Eds.). (1992). Triumph of the image: The media's war in the Persian Gulf—A global perspective. Boulder, CO: Westview Press.

Articles
 Mowlana, H. (1979). Technology versus tradition: Communication in the Iranian revolution. Journal of Communication, 29(3), 107–112.
 Mowlana, H. (1983). Mass media and culture: Toward an integrated theory. In W. B. Gudykunst (Ed.), Intercultural communication theory: Current perspectives (pp. 149–170). Beverly Hills, CA: Sage.   
 Mowlana, H. (1993). The new global order and cultural ecology. Media, Culture and Society, 15(1), 9–27. 
 Mowlana, H. (1994). Civil society, information society, and Islamic society: A comparative perspective. In S. Splichal, A. Calabrese, & C. Sparks (Eds.), Information society and civil society: Contemporary perspectives on the changing world order (pp. 208–232). West Lafayette, IN: Purdue University Press. 
 Mowlana, H. (1994). Shapes of the future: International communication in the 21st century. Journal of International Communication, 1(1), 14–32.
 Mowlana, H. (2001). Communication and development: Theoretical and methodological problems and prospects. In S. R. Melkote & S. Rao (Eds.), Critical issues in communication: Looking inward for answers—Essays in honor of K. E. Eapen (pp. 179–187). New Delhi, India: Sage.
 Mowlana, H. (2003). Communication, philosophy and religion. Journal of International Communication, 9(1), 11–34. 
 Mowlana, H. (2012). International communication: The journey of a caravan. Journal of International Communication, 18(2), 267–290. 
 Mowlana, H. (2014). Communication and cultural settings: An Islamic perspective. In M. K. Asante, Y. Miike, & J. Yin (Eds.), The global intercultural communication reader (2nd ed., pp. 237–247). New York, NY: Routledge.
 Mowlana, H. (2014). Global communication as cultural ecology. China Media Research, 10(3), 1–6. 
 Mowlana, H. (2016). The role of media in contemporary international relations: Culture and politics at the crossroads. Journal of Multicultural Discourses, 11(1), 84–96.
 Mowlana, H. (2018). On human communication. Javnost—The Public, 25(1/2), 226–232.
 Mowlana, H. (2019). Human communication theory: A five-dimensional model. Journal of International Communication, 25(1), 3–33. 
 Mowlana, H. (2021). The cultural dimensions of the coronavirus crisis: Soft power revisited. Journal of Multicultural Discourses, 16(1), 1–11.
 Mowlana, H. (2022). Paradigmatic debates, theoretical diversity, and the IAMCR: A historical perspective. In Y. Miike & J. Yin (Eds.), The handbook of global interventions in communication theory (pp. 42–60). New York, NY: Routledge.

See also
Communication theory
Cross-cultural communication
Development communication
International communication
Politics of Iran

References

American University faculty and staff
People from Tabriz
Iranian emigrants to the United States
American people of Iranian-Azerbaijani descent
Living people
Communication theorists
 
Iranian expatriate academics
1937 births
Iranian Science and Culture Hall of Fame recipients in Humanities